Valeria Șterbeț (born 15 November 1946) is a former Moldovan judge and politician. She served as Minister of Justice from 1999 to 2001.

References 

Living people
1946 births
Place of birth missing (living people)
Moldovan Ministers of Justice
21st-century Moldovan politicians
Women government ministers of Moldova
20th-century Moldovan women politicians
21st-century Moldovan women politicians
Female justice ministers
Moldovan judges